Mohd Fadzli Saari (born 1 January 1983) is a Malaysian former footballer who is an assistant coach for Perlis Northern Lions U19  . He was a member of the Malaysia national football team.

Career
Fadzli is one of the Malaysian footballers who was given a chance to play outside Malaysia. Together with another Malaysian player, Rudie Ramli he chose to play with a German club SV Wehen in 2001.

In 2004, he won the Malaysia Super League with Pahang.

With national side, he played in 2005 Islamic Solidarity Games when the national team reached quarter-final. He also was the captain at 2005 SEA Games in Bacolod, Philippines, where Malaysia won the bronze medal after defeating Indonesia Under-23 1–0 thanks to his only goal in the match.

He also represented the country in the 2007 AFC Asian Cup. He only played two matches in the tournament. In January 2009, Fadzli earned a national call up for the first time after being left out for one and a half years.

Career statistics

International
.

International Senior Goals

Honours
Pahang
Division 1/ Liga Super : 2004, 2005
Malaysia FA Cup : 2006
Selangor
Malaysia Cup : 2008
Charity Cup : 2011

References

External links 
 Player profile – doha-2006.com
 
 Profail Pemain – selangorfc.com

1983 births
Living people
Malaysian footballers
Malaysia international footballers
2007 AFC Asian Cup players
SV Wehen Wiesbaden players
Malaysian expatriate footballers
Expatriate footballers in Germany
Malaysian expatriate sportspeople in Germany
People from Pahang
Sri Pahang FC players
Selangor FA players
Terengganu F.C. II players
Malaysia Super League players
Association football forwards
Footballers at the 2002 Asian Games
Footballers at the 2006 Asian Games
Asian Games competitors for Malaysia